Otto Heller (1896–1970) was a Czech cinematographer.

Otto Heller may also refer to:
 Otto Heller (author) (1863–1941), author and academic
 Otto Heller (ice hockey) (1914–?), Swiss ice hockey player